Ezekiel Nathaniel (born 20 June 2003) is a Nigerian track and field athlete who is a 400 metre hurdler.

Career
Nathaniel studies at Baylor University in Texas. In May 2022, during his freshman year, he ran the 400m hurdles in a personal best time of 48.42, winning the Big Ten Conference title and breaking the Nigerian record set by Henry Amike in 1987. Subsequently at the 2022 World Athletics Championships in Eugene, Oregon, he ran his first-round heat in 49.64, qualifying for the semifinals.

References

External links
 Ezekiel Nathaniel at Baylor Bears track and field

2003 births
Living people
Nigerian male hurdlers
World Athletics Championships athletes for Nigeria
21st-century Nigerian people
Baylor Bears men's track and field athletes